Albert Wahl Hawkes (November 20, 1878May 9, 1971) was a United States senator from New Jersey.

Studies
He was born in Chicago on November 20, 1878. He attended the public schools and graduated from Chicago College of Law in 1900, gaining admission to the bar the same year. He studied chemistry at Lewis Institute (now the Illinois Institute of Technology) for two years and engaged in the chemical business.

Businessman
During the First World War, Albert Hawkes served as director of the Chemical Alliance in Washington, D.C. (1917–1918).  From 1927 to 1942, Hawkes served as president of Congoleum-Nairn, Inc., at Kearny, New Jersey. He assumed chairmanship of the corporation board in 1937. He was president and director of the Chamber of Commerce of the United States in 1941 and 1942, a member of the Newark Labor Board, and a member of the Board to Maintain Industrial Peace in New Jersey 1941-1942. Hawkes was a member of the National War Labor Board, Washington, D.C., in 1942.

Senator
In 1942, Albert Hawkes was elected in New Jersey as a Republican to the U.S. Senate and served from January 3, 1943, to January 3, 1949.  He was not a candidate for renomination in 1948, and resumed former business activities in Montclair, New Jersey, until 1961, when he moved to Pasadena, California.

Hawkes was a trustee of the Freedoms Foundation, where the Hawkes Library (in Valley Forge, Pennsylvania) was named after him.  He died on May 9, 1971, in Palm Desert, California.  He was interred in Mount Hebron Cemetery, in Montclair, New Jersey.

His daughter in law, Jane White Hawkes, was the second wife of the late Alistair Cooke, the British-American journalist who hosted Masterpiece Theatre.

References

External links

1878 births
1971 deaths
Politicians from Chicago
Republican Party United States senators from New Jersey
New Jersey Republicans
Illinois Institute of Technology alumni
Burials at Mount Hebron Cemetery (Montclair, New Jersey)